Axelia is a prehistoric genus of lobe-finned fish which belonged to the family of Coelacanthidae.

Species of Axelia
Axelia elegans Stensio, 1921
Axelia robusta Stensio, 1921

Coelacanthidae
Late Permian fish
Fossils of Svalbard
Fossil taxa described in 1921